Prince or King of Chenliu (陈留王) was a princely Chinese title during the Jin dynasty and its successor states, ending in 479.

It has been borne by:
 Cao Huan, being the title conferred upon him after his abdication as Emperor of Wei in favor of Sima Yan's Jin dynasty. He was a grandson of the warlord Cao Cao.
 Cao Mai, who held the position from 326 until his death in 358. He was a great-great grandson of the warlord Cao Cao, according to the Book of Jin.
 Cao Hui, who held the position from 363 until his death in 378. He was the son of Cao Mai.
 Cao Lingdan, who held the position from 383 until his death in 408.
 Cao Qiansi, who held the position until his death in 420.
 Cao Qianxiu, younger brother of Qiansi, who held the position from 421 until his death in 462.
 Cao Xian, son of Cao Qianxiu, who held the position from 463 until his death in 473.
 Cao Can, who held the position from 474 until 479.